The 2022 Norwegian First Division is the 38th season of the Norwegian First Division, the second-tier Norwegian women's football division, and the 21st season under the current format. The league consists of 10 teams. The season started on 19 March 2022.

Format
This season is the first with a new play-off system. It was set to be introduced in the 2020 season, but it was postponed due to the COVID-19 pandemic.

Teams

The following ten teams compete in the 2022 First Division:

Regular season
The regular season consists of 10 teams, who will play each other twice, totalling 18 matches per team. The top two teams qualify for the Toppserien play-offs. The other eight teams qualify for the First Division play-offs.

Results

First Division play-offs
The teams from 3rd to 10th position take part in the First Division play-offs. They carry over their points and goal difference from the regular season. Each team plays seven matches, once against each of the other teams. The winners qualify for the promotion play-offs, where they will face the 6th placed team in the Toppserien relegation round. The bottom two teams are relegated.

Results

References

External links
2022 Norwegian First Division at the Norwegian Football Federation 

Norwegian First Division (women) seasons
2
Norway
Norway